Oxetene is an unsaturated heterocycle. The compound is unstable and has been synthesized. Compared to oxetane, the saturated compound, oxetene is destabilized because the double bond increases the ring strain. Synthesis of some substituted derivatives has been reported.

Synthesis 
Oxetene can be synthesised by the photochemical cyclization of acrolein:

References 

Oxygen heterocycles
Four-membered rings